Jeff Floyd is a former American football coach. He served as the interim head football coach at Central Missouri State University for the final three games of 1996 season and as the head football coach at William Jewell College in Liberty, Missouri from 1997 to 2000, compiling a career college football coaching record of 17–25.

Floyd was the defensive coordinator at Central Missouri State until he was named interim head coach following the dismissal of Terry Noland.

Head coaching record

College

Notes

References

Year of birth missing (living people)
Living people
Central Missouri Mules football coaches
Truman Bulldogs football coaches
William Jewell Cardinals football coaches
William Jewell Cardinals football players
High school football coaches in Missouri